Jorge Iván Pailós Gaitán (born 3 October 1981 in Montevideo) is a Uruguayan footballer.

Club career
In January 2006, he was signed by Spanish side SD Eibar to avoid relegation to Segunda División B.

In mid-2010, he was transferred to Deportivo Malacateco where we played in the Liga Nacional de Fútbol de Guatemala.

In January 2012, he signed a new contract with the Argentine club Central Córdoba.

Cartaginés
In June 2012, he signed a new contract with the Costa Rican club C.S. Cartaginés. Pailós made his official debut for Cartaginés in the opening match in the Winter 2012, scoring his first official goal and the tie against Belén Siglo XXI. In the second game, Pailós scored his second goal with the club and that opened the scoring against San Carlos on the victory of Cartaginés 0–2, after a good left footed shot. His third goal for the club was against Carmelita, after an Eduardo Valverde center and Pailos score on header, for the 1–1. Pailos made his fourth goal, a penalty in the tie 1–1 against Herediano in the Clásico Provincial. In the second goal of Cartagines against Puntarenas, Pailos made a header assistance to Andres Lezcano for 2–1 after a throw in of Esteban Maitland. The fifth goal of Pailos in the club was also a penalty and the 3–1 against Puntarenas and was the 2500th goal in the history of the national championship at the stadium Fello Meza. On 7 November, Pailos Scored his sixth goal from the penalty spot against Herediano.

Career statistics

References

External links
 Pfofile at tenfieldigital.com.uy
 

1981 births
Living people
Footballers from Montevideo
Association football forwards
Uruguayan footballers
El Tanque Sisley players
Centro Atlético Fénix players
C.S. Cartaginés players
Juventud de Las Piedras players
Sud América players
SD Eibar footballers
Expatriate footballers in Spain
Expatriate footballers in Guatemala
C.D. Malacateco players